Vahibé is a village in the commune of Mamoudzou on Mayotte.

Geography

Climate

Vahibé has a tropical savanna climate (Köppen climate classification Aw).

References

Populated places in Mayotte